Raymond Siu Chak-yee  (Chinese: 蕭澤頤; born 2 April 1966) is the current Commissioner of Police of the Hong Kong Police Force since 25 June 2021. He previously served as Deputy Commissioner of Police (Operations) of the Hong Kong Police Force under his predecessor Chris Tang.

Education 
Siu received a Bachelor of Science with a course in chemistry from the University of Birmingham in England in 1988.

Career 
Siu joined the Royal Hong Kong Police Force as a probationary inspector in December 1988 and had since risen through the ranks, becoming chief superintendent in 2013, assistant commissioner (personnel) in 2017, senior assistant commissioner (director of operations) in 2018 and deputy commissioner (operations) in November 2019.

Siu has served in various posts of different job nature, mostly frontline operational units as well as criminal intelligence-related duties and Personnel Wing. During his career, Siu has attended overseas development courses at various training institutes including Tsinghua University, Stanford University, Harvard University and the Chinese Academy of Governance. 
 
Upon promotion to Senior Superintendent in 2007, Siu served as the Deputy District Commander of Kwai Tsing District and District Commander of Airport District. In 2013, he was promoted to Chief Superintendent and took over the command of Kowloon City District. Upon completion of a tour, he then assumed the post of Chief Superintendent, Human Resources Branch, Personnel Wing.
 
In January 2017, Siu was promoted to the rank of Assistant Commissioner of Police when he was then assigned to command the Personnel Wing. In November 2018, Siu was promoted to the rank of Senior Assistant Commissioner of Police, taking up the post of Director of Operations. In November 2019, Siu was appointed as Deputy Commissioner of Police (Operations).

Commissioner of Police 
With the nomination and recommendation of Chief Executive Carrie Lam, the State Council appointed Siu as the Commissioner of Police on 25 June 2021, succeeding Chris Tang who was promoted to serve in Carrie Lam's administration as Secretary for Security.

In October 2021, Siu declined to meet with Amber Poon's mother when she invited him to join her for a press conference.

On 5 January 2022, Carrie Lam announced new warnings and restrictions against social gathering due to potential COVID-19 outbreaks. One day later, it was discovered that Siu attended a birthday party hosted by Witman Hung Wai-man, with 222 guests. At least one guest tested positive with COVID-19, causing many guests to be quarantined. Sui later said that his attendance was part of community engagement and to meet stakeholders. He was ordered to take leave until 24 January. Later in June 2022, Siu said that he did not break any laws and that he is not interested in alcohol.

On 24 September 2022, Siu said that the threat of terrorists in Hong Kong was at a moderate level, and that there was no specific threats or intelligence that the city was targeted. However, Siu said "We cannot let our guard down. There are still some people going underground and using soft resistance tactics to try to incite people to come out. We will closely monitor our intelligence and see whether such acts are happening online."

In January 2023, Siu said that fake news about police must be corrected within 2 hours, and said that fake news had a big impact on the 2019-20 Hong Kong protests.

In February 2023, Siu disagreed with a reporter who asked if police were too focused on the national security law, after reports showed that crime had increased 10% from 2021 to 2022.

Personal life 
In August 2022, Siu tested positive for COVID-19.

References 

 

 
 

1966 births
Living people
Hong Kong Police commissioners
Hong Kong civil servants
Government officials of Hong Kong